Christopher Charles Miles (1850 – 13 November 1936) was a New Zealand cricketer. He played in one first-class match for Wellington in 1883/84.

See also
 List of Wellington representative cricketers

References

External links
 

1850 births
1936 deaths
New Zealand cricketers
Wellington cricketers
Sportspeople from Wiltshire